Manuel de Ascázubi y Matheu (30 December 1804 – 25 December 1876) served as Vice President of Ecuador from 1847 to 1849 and in that capacity he was also interim President from 16 October 1849 to 10 June 1850.

Biography 
Don Manuel Ascázubi y Matheu was born in Quito (1804). His parents were Don José de Ascázubi y Matheu and Doña Mariana Matheu y Herrera of Quito, landed aristocracy. Even though he was the heir to the titles of Marques de Maenza and Conde de Puñonrostro, he sided with the promoters of independence from the Spanish crown. He married Carmen Salinas de la Vega, daughter of Juan de Salinas, one the original leaders of the rebellion against Spain. They had four daughters.

Due to his involvement in the independence movement he and his family were persecuted both politically and economically by the royalists.

He was Minister of Finance twice in 1868. He also served as acting President from 16 May 1869 to 10 August 1869.

He was the brother-in-law of President Gabriel García Moreno. He was a member of the Constitutional Assembly and fought to keep certain conservative principles within it. Between August and October 1875 he was the Minister of the Interior and of Foreign affairs.

Manuel de Ascázubi died of a heart attack in Quito on December 25, 1876.

References

External links

 Official Website of the Ecuadorian Government about the country President's History
 euskalnet.net

1802 births
1876 deaths
People from Quito
Ecuadorian people of Basque descent
Ecuadorian Roman Catholics
Conservative Party (Ecuador) politicians
Presidents of Ecuador
Vice presidents of Ecuador
Ecuadorian Ministers of Finance
Government ministers of Ecuador
19th-century Ecuadorian people